Sami VeSusu is an Israeli restaurant serving Romanian cuisine at 179 Ohelei Keidar Street in Beersheba, inside the city's municipal market.

History 
The restaurant was established in April 1970. It was named after a popular Arabic-language television series that was broadcast in the early days of Israeli television.

Concept 
Sami and Susu is a simple workers' restaurant with vermeric tables and wooden chairs. On the walls is embroidery from Romania that the founder Marcel Lerer brought with him, when he immigrated to Israel in 1964, and circles resembling beer barrels with advertisements for Goldstar beer.

Sami and Susu was the first restaurant in Beersheba to serve meat by weight. It has been frequented by celebrities, including actors, singers, and politicians.

The restaurant's flagship dishes include Romanian kebabs, brain, oats, veal, chorba and homemade salads like ikra and Romanian eggplant salad.

References

1970 establishments in Israel
Culture of Beersheba
Jewish restaurants
Romanian-Jewish culture in Israel
Romanian restaurants
Companies based in Beersheba
Restaurants in Israel
Sephardi Jewish cuisine
Sephardi Jewish culture in Israel